= Jacipunco =

Coordinates: 27°14′31″S 67°00′40″W

- Municipality and village
- Interactive map of Jacipunco
- Country: Argentina
- Province: Catamarca Province
- Time zone: UTC−3 (ART)

Jacipunco is a village and municipality in Catamarca Province in northwestern Argentina.
